Joanne (alternate spellings Joann, Jo Ann, Johann, Johanne, Jo-Ann, Jo-Anne) is a common given name for women, being a variant of Joanna. In Northern Ireland of 1975, "Joanne" was the most frequently used name for female newborns, though by the early years of the 21st century, the name had declined in popularity so that it could not be counted among the twenty most frequently used.

Sometimes in modern English Joanne is reinterpreted as a compound of the two names Jo and Anne, and therefore given a spelling like JoAnne, Jo-Anne, or Jo Anne. However, the original name Joanna in ancient Greek and Latin is a single unit, not a compound. The names Hannah, Anna, Anne, Ann are etymologically related to Joanne just the same: they are derived from Hebrew חַנָּה Ḥannāh 'grace' from the same verbal root meaning "to be gracious".

People with the given name Joanne
 Joanne Accom (born 1978), Australian singer
 Joanne Acalcichew (born 1986), British dispenser  
 Joanne Banning (born 1977), Australian field hockey player
 JoAnne S. Bass, first female senior enlisted service member of any U.S. military branch
 Joanne Beaumier (born 1996), Lebanese footballer
 Joanne Brackeen (born 1938), American jazz pianist
 Joanne Campbell (1964–2002), British actress
 Joanne Catherall (born 1962), British singer, member of The Human League
 Joanne Colan, British video blogger
 Joanne Deakins (born 1972), British swimmer
 Joanne Dennehy (born 1982), serial killer
 Joanne Doyle (born 1972), Irish dancer 
 Joanne Dru (1922–1996), American actress
 Joanne Durant (born 1975), Barbadian sprinter
 Joanne Elliott (born 1925), American mathematician
 Joanne Ellis (born 1981), English field hockey player
 Joanne Fluke (born 1943), American novelist
 Joanne (Jo) Frost (born 1970), English nanny, writer and TV hostess
 Joanne Grant (1930–2005), African-American journalist and Communist activist
 Joanne Harris (born 1964), British novelist
 Jo Hayes, New Zealand politician
 Joanne Head (1930–2021), American politician
 Joanne Herring (born 1929), American political activist
 Joanne C. Hillhouse (born 1970s), Antiguan writer and journalist
 Joanne Kelly (born 1978), Canadian actress
 Joanne McNally (born 1983), Irish stand-up comedian, writer and actress
 Joanne Rowling (born 1965), British author
 Joanne Pavey (born 1973), British runner
 Joanne Peh (born 1983), Singaporean actress
 Joanne Shaw Taylor (born 1986), English blues singer and guitarist
 Joanne Shenandoah (born 1958), American singer and guitarist
 Joanne Stoker (born 1983/84), British footwear designer
 Joanne Whalley (born 1961), British actress
 Joanne Woodward (born 1930), American actress

See also
Jo-Anne, given name
Johanne, given name
Joanna, given name

References

External links
 "Joanna" at Edgar's Name Pages – with history, naming frequency statistics, related names, and famous namebearers
 Icons of St. Joanna the Myrrh-Bearer here and here

Feminine given names
English feminine given names
Polish feminine given names